The Ohel Yitzchak Synagogue also known as the Shomrei ha-Chomos Synagogue and the Ungarin Shul (Hungarian synagogue) is located in the Muslim Quarter of the Old City of Jerusalem. It was built as a yeshiva in the 1870s by Kolel Shomrei HaChomos, an organization of Hungarian Jews, but was abandoned after the riots of 1938. Although the building was destroyed after 1948, it has recently been acquired by a Religious Zionist group for refurbishment and was reopened after restoration work finished in October 2008.

Establishment
In 1862 students of the Chassam Sofer, Rabbi Moses Sofer, arrived in Jerusalem from Hungary and established a community called Shomrei HaChomos, meaning Guardians of the Walls. During the 1870s they built a yeshiva situated about 100 meters from the Chain Gate on el-Wad Street, in today’s Muslim Quarter. The courtyard was purchased from the Muslim Khaladi family. Rabbi Yitzchok Ratsdorfer, a diamond merchant who belonged to the Hasidic group Belz, financed the building. 

In 1892 the community established a neighborhood outside the Old City walls called Batei Ungarin, part of the neighborhood now known as Meah Shearim. In 1904 the yeshiva in the Old City was expanded and a second story was added. While construction was taking place, the Ottoman authorities warned that the extension would not be allowed. They opposed the fact that its roof would end up being taller than the Dome of the Rock. Construction of the roof was completed overnight, ensuring that the building would be finished. Turkish law stated that once a building had been erected, it could no longer be demolished. 

The building accommodated the yeshiva on the ground floor called Ohr Meir and its students held study sessions 24 hours a day. The top floor accommodated two prayer rooms, one for the Chasidim, who use Nusach Sefard, and one for the Perushim, who use Nusach Ashkenaz. The building also contained a mikvah.

Abandonment

Although the riots of 1920 and 1929 disturbed the running of the yeshiva, Jews still frequented the building until Arab violence forced them to vacate the premises during the 1938 riots. Members relocated to Meah Shearim, and the building was rented to Arabs until the 1948 Arab–Israeli War, during which it was destroyed. 

Its members relocated their entire organization, Kolel Shomrei HaChomos, to other locations in the city, including Meah Shearim, Givat Shaul, and more recently Ramat Shlomo, where they built new buildings and synagogues called Kiryas Shomrei HaChomos. Kolel Shomrei HaChomos is closely affiliated with the Edah HaChareidis and considered part of it.

Rededication
In 1967, after the Six-Day War, all that remained intact was the ground floor of the building, which was turned into a Jewish book store.

Years later the Religious Zionist organization Ateret Cohanim encouraged an American charity funded by American Jewish businessman Irving Moskowitz, a regular donor to right-wing groups in East Jerusalem, to buy the building. The organization then gave the Western Wall Heritage Foundation the right to manage the synagogue site and the excavations. In October 2008 the yeshiva was officially reopened as a synagogue.

See also
 Kolel Shomrei HaChomos
 Edah HaChareidis

Sources
Rossoff, Dovid. Where Heaven Touches Earth, Guardian Press, 1998. 
Horovitz, Ahron. Jerusalem, Footsteps Through Time, Feldheim, 2000. 
Wagner, Maththew. 'Lost' synagogue reopens in Jerusalem's Muslim Quarter, Jerusalem Post, October 12, 2008.

References

Synagogues in Jerusalem
Late modern history of Jerusalem
Rebuilt synagogues
Synagogues completed in the 1870s
Synagogues completed in 1904
Muslim Quarter (Jerusalem)